Teuku Mohammad Hasan (EVO: Teoekoe Moehammad Hasan; 4 April 1906 – 21 September 1997) was an Indonesian politician and national hero from Aceh, who served as the first and only governor of Sumatra from 1945 until 1948. He also served as a cabinet minister in Sjafruddin Prawiranegara's emergency cabinet and was a member of both the Senate of the United States of Indonesia (USI) and the Provisional People's Representative Council (DPRS) of the Republic of Indonesia.

Born to an aristocratic family in present-day Aceh, Teuku Mohammad Hasan studied law at Leiden University. During his time there, he joined the Perhimpoenan Indonesia association, becoming involved in the Indonesian independence movement. After graduating in 1933, he returned to Aceh, and became active in the Islamic organization Muhammadiyah. During the Japanese occupation, he was a member of the Preparatory Committee for Indonesian Independence. Following the proclamation of independence, he was appointed governor of Sumatra by the Central Indonesian National Committee. After the fall of the Indonesian government in Yogyakarta, he took part in the emergency government (PDRI) headed by Sjafruddin Prawiranegara. In the PDRI, he filled the position of minister in the ministries of Home Affairs, Religious Affairs, and Education.

Following the Dutch–Indonesian Round Table Conference and the end of national revolution, Teuku Mohammad Hasan served as a senator in the USI. During his time in the senate, he was elected deputy speaker to Melkias Agustinus Pellaupessy. After the dissolution of the USI and the establishment of a unitary state, he served as a member of the DPRS. In the DPRS, he advocated for oil companies operating in the country to be nationalized. He left the DPRS in 1955, and worked for the ministry of Home Affairs. During the New Order regime, he left politics entirely, and focused on education instead. In 1984, he founded the Veranda of Mecca University in Banda Aceh. He died in Jakarta, on 21 September 1997. In 2006, he was named a national hero by President Susilo Bambang Yudhoyono.

Early life
Muhammad Hasan was born on April 4, 1906 as Teuku Sarong, into an aristocratic family in Sigli, Aceh. His father, Teuku Bintara Pineung Ibrahim was an Ulèë Balang in Pidie (Ulèë Balang was an aristocratic class in Aceh who led a district).

He went to Volksschool (Common School) in Lampoeh Saka from 1914-1917. In 1924 he studied at Dutch-language Europeesche Lagere School (RLS), After graduating in 1924, he studied at Koningin Wilhelmina School (KWS) in Batavia (now Jakarta) before attending Rechtshoogeschool (Law High School).

Netherlands
He went to the Netherlands at age 25 to study Law at Leiden University.

During his time in Netherlands, he joined Indonesian student organization Perhimpunan Indonesia and became an independence activist with other Indonesian students like Mohammad Hatta and Sutan Sjahrir.

He graduated as Master of Laws in 1933.

Independence struggle
Hasan returned to Indonesia, and landed in Ulèë Lheuë Sea Port, Kutaradja (now Banda Aceh) in 1934. His activities brought suspicion by the Dutch authorities, who confiscated his books and other possessions.

He was active in Islamic organization Muhammadiyah. During this era, they started schools and a female branch of the organization, Aisyiah.

His other education activity was establishing Perguruan Taman Siswa Aceh Chapter in Kutaraja, on 11 July 1937. He served as chairman, with Teuku Nyak Arif as secretary.

He made a scholarship foundation Atjehsche Studiefonds (Aceh Students Foundation) for supporting poor students.

He chaired Perkumpulan Usaha Sama Akan Kemajuan Anak (Mutual Struggle Association for Children Development, or abbreviated as PUSAKA) attempting to build a school similar to Dutch's Holland Inlandsche School.

During the Japanese occupation of the Dutch East Indies  (1942 - 1945), he was chairman of Koperasi Ladang Pegawai Negeri (Field Cooperative for the Civil Servants) in Medan

He was a member of the Sumatran Investigating Committee for Preparatory Work for Independence (BPUPK) and subsequenntly the Preparatory Committee for Indonesian Independence. This body was chaired by Sukarno, who declared Indonesian independence on August 17, 1945, two days after Japan surrendered to the Allied Forces at the end of the Pacific War.

Governor of Sumatra
He was appointed by the newly created Republic of Indonesia Government as the first Governor of Sumatra on August 22, 1945.

Emergency Government
In December 1948, the Dutch launched their Second Police Action and focused their attack on Yogyakarta. Sukarno and Hatta chose to remain in the city and were arrested.

Hearing the president was arrested, Sjafruddin Prawiranegara, the Minister of Welfare, who was in Bukit Tinggi met Hasan, then Governor of Sumatra and Colonel Hidayat, Commander of Army and Territory of Sumatra on December 19, 1948. and established the Emergency Government of the Republic of Indonesia (PDRI), on December 22, 1948,  in Bukittinggi, Sumatra. Sjafruddin served as chairman of the emergency cabinet.

Hasan was appointed as Deputy Chairman of the PDRI, Minister of Home Affairs, Education & Culture and Religious Affairs ad interim.

PDRI leaders moved around West Sumatra in an effort to evade arrest by the Dutch who wanted to abolish the group. In 1949 the PDRI government contacted the leaders of Indonesian forces in Java and the sixth Republic of Indonesia government ministers in Java who had escaped arrest.

Based on the Roem–Van Roijen Agreement, on July 13, 1949, Dutch troops were to be pulled from Republic of Indonesia regions and their leaders were to be freed. The PDRI would therefore no longer be required, and Sjafruddin Prawiranegara disbanded the PDRI and returned the mandate to the President of Republic of Indonesia

Oil companies nationalization
In 1951, as chair of Trading and Industry Commission of DPRS (People's Representative Council), he advocated for oil company nationalization in Indonesia. His motion was accepted on August 2, 1951. Some Dutch oil companies were integrated into Permina (1957) and Pertamin (1961). Both companies were merged in 1968 as Pertamina.

Later life
Hasan established Serambi Mekkah University in Banda Aceh, and writing books. One of his book is Sejarah Perminyakan di Indonesia (published by Yayasan Sari Pinang Sakti, 1985).

Teuku Muhammad Hasan died on September 21, 1997 in Jakarta.

Recognition
In 1990, University of North Sumatra honored him with Doctor Honoris Causa.

Hasan was recognized as National Hero of Indonesia by Republic Indonesia Government on dated November 3, 2006.

A street in Banda Aceh is named after him.

References

External links
  Kepustakaan Presiden RI
 Wayback Machine TEUKU MUHAMMAD HASAN MENTERI PENDIDIKAN ”DARURAT”
  Sejarah Pertamina

Politicians from Aceh
Acehnese people
Indonesian Muslims
National Heroes of Indonesia
People from Sigli
1906 births
1997 deaths
Government ministers of Indonesia
Leiden University alumni
Members of Senate of the United States of Indonesia
Rechtshogeschool te Batavia alumni